Edward Bowler Millton (7 March 1861 – 11 March 1942) was a New Zealand rugby union player who represented his country in 1884, playing as a forward.

He was a member of the first New Zealand national rugby union team, which toured New South Wales in 1884. He played in seven of the eight matches on that tour, scoring one try. He did not play in any Test matches, as New Zealand did not play its first full international until 1903.

Millton and his older brother, William, who captained the New Zealand team on the 1884 tour to New South Wales, have the distinction of being the first brothers to represent New Zealand in rugby.

Millton married Maud Eliza Ford at St Peter's Church, Riccarton, on 22 March 1892. He died at Loburn on 11 March 1942. He bequeathed his sheep farm, Birch Hill Station, and another property at Okuku, to the Sunlight League of New Zealand for the establishment of the "Ford Millton Memorial Home for Children".

References

1861 births
1942 deaths
New Zealand international rugby union players
New Zealand rugby union players
People educated at Christ's College, Christchurch
Rugby union players from Christchurch
Canterbury rugby union players
Rugby union forwards
Wellington rugby union players
New Zealand philanthropists
New Zealand farmers